East Jutland is one of the 12 multi-member constituencies of the Folketing, the national legislature of Denmark. The constituency was established in 2007 following the public administration structural reform. It consists of the municipalities of Aarhus, Favrskov, Hedensted, Horsens, Norddjurs, Odder, Randers, Samsø, Skanderborg and Syddjurs. The constituency currently elects 18 of the 179 members of the Folketing using the open party-list proportional representation electoral system. At the 2022 general election it had 602,870 registered electors.

Electoral system
East Jutland currently elects 18 of the 179 members of the Folketing using the open party-list proportional representation electoral system. Constituency seats are allocated using the D'Hondt method. Compensatory seats are calculated based on the national vote and are allocated using the Sainte-Laguë method, initially at the provincial level and finally at the constituency level. Only parties that reach any one of three thresholds stipulated by section 77 of the Folketing (Parliamentary) Elections Act - winning at least one constituency seat; obtaining at least the Hare quota (valid votes in province/number of constituency seats in province) in two of the three provinces; or obtaining at least 2% of the national vote - compete for compensatory seats.

Election results

Summary

(Excludes compensatory seats)

Detailed

2022
Results of the 2022 general election held on 1 November 2022:

Votes per municipality:<

The following candidates were elected:
 Constituency seats - Kirsten Normann Andersen (F), 8,693 votes; Jakob Ellemann-Jensen (V), 32,859 votes; Tobias Grotkjær Elmstrøm (M), 4,085 votes; Camilla Fabricius (A), 4,510 votes; Leif Lahn Jensen (A), 7,443 votes; Michael Aastrup Jensen (V), 8,195 votes; Jens Joel (A), 6,418 votes; Mona Juul (C), 3,695 votes; Malte Larsen (A), 6,313 votes; Jens Meilvang (I), 1,642 votes; Charlotte Broman Mølbæk (F), 2,982 votes; Thomas Monberg (A), 5,479 votes; Troels Lund Poulsen (V), 6,863 votes; Katrine Robsøe (B), 3,736 votes; Hans Kristian Skibby (Æ), 3,112 votes; Alex Vanopslagh (I), 38,284 votes; Mai Villadsen (Ø) 14,631 votes; and Nicolai Wammen (A), 18,022 votes.
 Compensatory seats - Louise Brown (I), 1,085 votes; Torsten Gejl (Å), 3,444 votes; Peter Have (M), 952 votes; Karin Liltorp (M), 3,375 votes; Sofie Lippert (F), 2,338 votes; Lars Boje Mathiesen (D), 11,150 votes; and Nick Zimmermann (O), 1,039 votes.

2019
Results of the 2019 general election held on 5 June 2019:

Votes per municipality:

The following candidates were elected:
 Constituency seats - Kirsten Normann Andersen (F), 7,885 votes; Britt Bager (V), 17,725 votes; Jakob Ellemann-Jensen (V), 36,354 votes; Camilla Fabricius (A), 11,812 votes; Leif Lahn Jensen (A), 12,967 votes; Michael Aastrup Jensen (V), 18,423 votes; Jens Joel (A), 11,129 votes; Mona Juul (C), 9,820 votes; Henrik Dam Kristensen (A), 14,878 votes; Malte Larsen (A), 10,596 votes; Charlotte Broman Mølbæk (F), 2,641 votes; Fatma Øktem (V), 9,436 votes; Morten Østergaard (B), 17,781 votes; Troels Lund Poulsen (V), 12,063 votes; Katrine Robsøe (B), 3,430 votes; Hans Kristian Skibby (O), 2,834 votes; Nikolaj Villumsen (Ø) 6,254 votes; and Nicolai Wammen (A), 42,498 votes.
 Compensatory seats - Heidi Bank (V), 5,651 votes; Anne Sophie Callesen (B), 1,926 votes; Mette Dencker (O), 2,348 votes; Torsten Gejl (Å), 1,383 votes; Daniel Toft Jakobsen (A), 8,737 votes; Lars Boje Mathiesen (D), 2,396 votes; and Ole Birk Olesen (I), 2,020 votes.

2015
Results of the 2015 general election held on 18 June 2015:

Votes per municipality:

The following candidates were elected:
 Constituency seats - Britt Bager (V), 13,820 votes; Tilde Bork (O), 11,686 votes; Kirsten Brosbøl (A), 18,970 votes; Hans Kristian Bundgaard-Skibby (O), 15,310 votes; Kim Christiansen (O), 10,712 votes; Mette Hjermind Dencker (O), 23,171 votes; Jakob Ellemann-Jensen (V), 17,625 votes; Josephine Fock (Å), 11,456 votes; Leif Lahn Jensen (A), 11,793 votes; Michael Aastrup Jensen (V), 10,995 votes; Jens Joel (A), 13,081 votes; Henrik Dam Kristensen (A), 15,790 votes; Ole Birk Olesen (I), 20,580 votes; Morten Østergaard (B), 14,534 votes; Maja Panduro (A), 14,738 votes; Troels Lund Poulsen (V), 9,634 votes; Nikolaj Villumsen (Ø) 6,415 votes; and Nicolai Wammen (A), 37,903 votes.
 Compensatory seats - Carsten Bach (I), 6,459 votes; Jonas Dahl (F), 5,316 votes; Claus Kvist Hansen (O), 6,251 votes; Daniel Toft Jakobsen (A), 8,353 votes; Naser Khader (C), 7,374 votes; and Søren Egge Rasmussen (Ø) 5,320 votes.

2011
Results of the 2011 general election held on 15 September 2011:

Votes per municipality:

The following candidates were elected:
 Constituency seats - Kim Andersen (V), 9,896 votes; Liv Holm Andersen (B), 6,839 votes; Kirsten Brosbøl (A), 11,285 votes; Anne-Mette Winther Christiansen (V), 7,830 votes; Kim Christiansen (O), 10,004 votes; Per Clausen (Ø) 6,525 votes; Jonas Dahl (F), 8,280 votes; Lykke Friis (V), 57,428 votes; Leif Lahn Jensen (A), 10,785 votes; Michael Aastrup Jensen (V), 16,352 votes; Karen Jespersen (V), 9,080 votes; Henrik Dam Kristensen (A), 14,159 votes; Ole Birk Olesen (I), 14,120 votes; Morten Østergaard (B), 25,047 votes; Maja Panduro (A), 11,609 votes; Troels Lund Poulsen (V), 18,122 votes; Hans Kristian Skibby (O), 8,801 votes; and Nicolai Wammen (A), 51,399 votes.
 Compensatory seats - Eigil Andersen (F), 4,295 votes; Tom Behnke (C), 7,191 votes; Mette Hjermind Dencker (O), 8,579 votes; Torben Hansen (A), 7,853 votes; Jens Joel (A), 8,397 votes; Jeppe Mikkelsen (B), 4,696 votes; Fatma Øktem (V), 6,151 votes;

2007
Results of the 2007 general election held on 13 November 2007:

Votes per municipality:

The following candidates were elected:
 Constituency seats - Eigil Andersen (F), 6,601 votes; Kim Andersen (V), 13,097 votes; Svend Auken (A), 43,122 votes; René Skau Björnsson (A), 7,820 votes; Kirsten Brosbøl (A), 13,564 votes; Anne-Mette Winther Christiansen (V), 10,907 votes; Pernille Frahm (F), 15,130 votes; Torben Hansen (A), 10,824 votes; Leif Lahn Jensen (A), 9,778 votes; Michael Aastrup Jensen (V), 19,030 votes; Karen Jespersen (V), 28,681 votes; Henriette Kjær (C), 22,919 votes; Henrik Dam Kristensen (A), 19,500 votes; Morten Messerschmidt (O), 32,521 votes; Morten Østergaard (B), 9,096 votes; Troels Lund Poulsen (V), 17,693 votes; and Hans Kristian Skibby (O), 7,421 votes.
 Compensatory seats - Tom Behnke (C), 8,434 votes; Kim Christiansen (O), 3,532 votes; Per Clausen (Ø) 2,227 votes; Jonas Dahl (F), 7,296 votes; Anne-Marie Meldgaard (A), 7,631 votes; Anders Samuelsen (Y), 11,218 votes; and Eyvind Vesselbo (V), 9,752 votes.

References

Folketing constituency
Folketing constituencies
Folketing constituencies established in 2007